Two ships of the Royal Navy have borne the name HMS Velox, Latin for 'swift':

She was sunk by a mine in 1915.
  was a V-class destroyer launched in 1917, converted to a long range escort in 1942 and scrapped in 1947.

Royal Navy ship names